Juan Sebastián Cabal and Alejandro Falla were the defending champions, but they chose to not participate this year.
Sebastián Decoud and Eduardo Schwank defeated 2nd seed Diego Junqueira and David Marrero 6–0, 6–2 in the final.

Seeds

Draw

Draw

References
 Doubles Draw

Seguros Bolivar Open Medellin - Doubles
2009 Doubles